The list of FarmHouse brothers includes notable initiated members of FarmHouse fraternity.

Agriculture

Athletics and entertainment

Business

Education

Government

References

External links 
 Official FarmHouse Website

FarmHouse
brothers